Clarence J. Tauzer (July 7, 1897 - September 4, 1948) was a United States lawyer and politician.

Tauzer served  in the United States Army during World War I.  In the 1920s, he was a football, basketball and sports coach at Santa Rosa Junior College. He moved to Santa Rosa, California in 1923 to join a law practice.  He had just graduated from Stanford Law School where he had been student body president and captain of the basketball team.

Tauzer became a member of the California State Senate in 1947. He filled a seat vacated by the death of Herbert Slater.  Tauzer died one year later; suffering a heart attack in San Francisco at the age of 51.

References

External links
Join California Clarence J. "Red" Tauzer

United States Army personnel of World War I
1897 births
1948 deaths
20th-century American politicians
Republican Party California state senators
United States Army personnel of World War II